Gramps (formerly GRAMPS, an acronym for Genealogical Research and Analysis Management Programming System) is a free and open source genealogy software. Gramps is programmed in Python using PyGObject. It uses Graphviz to create relationship graphs.

Gramps is a rare example of commons-based peer production  as free and open-source software created by genealogists, for genealogists. It has been described as intuitive and easy-to-use for hobbyists and "feature-complete for professional genealogists". The program is acknowledged as the "most popular FOSS program for genealogy" by Eastman and others. The Australian consumer advocacy group, CHOICE, has recommended Gramps. 

The program is extensible such that, in addition to human family trees, it has been used to create animal pedigree charts as well as academic genealogy showing mentoring relationships between scientists, physicians, and scholars.

Features
Gramps is one of the biggest offline genealogy suites available. Features include:
 Supports multiple languages and cultures, including patronymic, matronymic, and multiple surname systems.
 Full Unicode support.
 Relationship calculators. Some languages have relationship terminology with no proper translation to other languages. Gramps deals with this by allowing for language specific relationship calculators.
 Generates reports in multiple formats, including .odt, LaTeX, .pdf, .rtf, .html, and .txt.
 Produces a wide variety of reports and charts, including relationship graphs that of large complex acyclic charts.
 Gramps is easily extended via plugins called Gramplets. A Gramplet is a view of data that either changes dynamically during the running of Gramps, or provides interactivity to your genealogical data.
 Gramps employs an explicit event-centric documentation approach, similar to the CIDOC Conceptual Reference Model used by many cultural heritage institutions.
 "Sanity check" flagging of improbable events, such as births involving people extremely young or old.
 Support for multiple calendars, e.g. Gregorian calendar, Julian calendar, Islamic calendar, etc.
 Complete programmer's API documentation with free and open source code made publicly available.

File format 

The core export file format of Gramps is named Gramps XML and uses the file extension .gramps. It is extended from XML. Gramps XML is a free format. Gramps usually compresses Gramps XML files with gzip. The file format Portable Gramps XML Package uses the extension .gpkg and is currently a .tar.gz archive including Gramps XML together with all referenced media. The user may rename the file extension .gramps to .gz for editing the content of the genealogy document with a text editor. Internally, Gramps uses SQLite as the default database backend, with other databases available as plugins.

Gramps can import from the following formats: Gramps XML, Gramps Package (Portable Gramps XML), Gramps 2.x .grdb (older versions Gramps), GEDCOM, CSV.

Gramps supports exporting data in the following formats: Gramps XML, Gramps Package (Portable Gramps XML), GEDCOM, GeneWeb's GW format, Web Family Tree (.WFT) format, vCard, vCalendar, CSV.

Programs that support Gramps XML 
 PhpGedView (version 4.1 and up) supports output to Gramps XML.
 The script tmg2gramps by Anne Jessel converts The Master Genealogist v6 genealogy software datafile to a Gramps v2.2.6 XML.
 The Gramps PHP component JoomlaGen for Joomla uses an upload of the GRAMPS XML database export to show genealogical information and overviews. JoomlaGen is compatible with GRAMPS 3.3.0.
 Betty by Bart Feenstra generates static websites from Gramps XML and Gramps XML Package files as alternatives to GEDCOM.

Languages 
Gramps is available in 45 languages (December 2014).

Gramps also has two special use sub-translation languages:
 Animal pedigree which allows to keep track of the pedigree and breed of animals
 Same gender/sex which gives the option of removing gender-biased verbiage from reports.

 Release history The project began as GRAMPS in 2001, and the first stable release was in 2004.

The following table shows a selected history of new feature releases for project. (Patches and bug fixes are published on GitHub and periodically collated in minor "bug fix" releases.)

 Full history of previous releases.

References

External links 

 
 Gramps wiki site
 Gramps database formats
  - Source code
  - Mailing List
 Reviews on Gramps
 Genealogy research with Gramps. LWN.net 2014.

This article contains text from the GNU GPL Gramps Manual V2.9.

Free genealogy software
Free software programmed in Python
Cross-platform free software
Free multilingual software
MacOS software
Linux software
Windows software
Software that uses GTK
Software that uses PyGObject